Michael Kenneth "Mookie" Moore (born November 1, 1976) is a former American football guard.

Career 
Moore played college football at the University of Alabama and Troy State University. He was drafted in the fourth round of the 2000 NFL Draft. Moore played for the National Football League teams of Washington Redskins and the Atlanta Falcons.

Personal life 
Moore is the brother of Devin Moore of the Strickland v. Sony case. He became a member of Phi Beta Sigma fraternity through the Theta Delta chapter at the University of Alabama.

Notes

1976 births
Living people
People from Fayette, Alabama
American football offensive guards
Alabama Crimson Tide football players
Troy Trojans football players
Washington Redskins players
Frankfurt Galaxy players
Atlanta Falcons players
American expatriate sportspeople in Germany